

Education
Professor Leah Marangu was born in South Imenti in Meru County and she attended Kaaga High School and later trained as a public health nurse and Midwifery at Maua Methodist Hospital. She later on trained for a Bachelor of Science Degree in Home Economics from Olivet Nazarene University. She has two Master of Science Degrees in Home Economics and Family Environment from Northern Illinois University. Later she attained a Ph.D. in Home Economics from Iowa State University to become a Professor of Home Economics

Career 
Leah Marangu was the vice-chancellor of Africa Nazarene University between 1996-2017 and one of Kenya’s most distinguished and decorated scholars. 
A woman of many firsts, Professor Marangu was appointed a full Professor and chair of the Department of Home Economics at Kenyatta University in 1978, becoming the first woman Professor in Kenya. She has also been chair of the board of directors at Jomo Kenyatta Foundation  in 2005 and her appointment marked the first time ever a woman had held such a post in a parastatal in Kenya. She has served Kenya in various capacities, including Commission for University Education (CUE, Egerton University Council, National Council of Science and Technology, Kenya Bureau of Standards, Kenya Institute of Education (KIE), Institute of Policy Analysis and Research (IPAR), Inter University Council for East Africa (IUCEA), Taskforce on Performance Contract, among other bodies.

Awards 
Marangu is considered by Global Peace Foundation   as one of Kenya's leading humanitarians and is highly decorated both locally and internationally. She is an honorary alumni of Kenyatta University and is decorated with Moran of the Prof. Leah Marangu received Order of the Burning Spear (MBS) and Silver Star of Kenya by H.E. President Mwai Kibaki and retired president Daniel Moi respectively . She received an International Leadership and Character Award and Distinguished Achievement Citation by Iowa State University. The University of Nairobi has also recognized her as one of the Women  Trailblazers in Kenya as an educationist. 

She is also an Outstanding Alumni Lay Award, and Doctor of Letters (D.Litt.) all from Olivet NazareneUniversity.

Publications 
Marangu has published in more than 50 peer-reviewed publications and has attracted over US$2.1 million in research grants. Prior to her appointment as the vice-chancellor at Africa Nazarene University, Marangu was a visiting professor at Brigham Young University in the US, where she had also worked as a professor for 12 other leading universities.

Family 
Marangu is a dedicated family person, married to a fellow Professor John Marangu,  she is a mother and a grandmother.

References

External links
Iowa State University
Nazarene University
Olivet Nazarene University
Ministry of Public Service and Gender

Year of birth missing (living people)
Living people
Meru people
Africa Nazarene University